Nimba Football Club is a Professional football club based in Ganta, Nimba County, Liberia.

Players

First-team squad

Notable former players

  Sam Johnson (footballer, born 1993)

Achievements 
Liberian Premier League: 0
Liberian Cup: 0
Liberian Super Cup: 0

References

Football clubs in Liberia
Nimba County